The Pahoturi languages are a small family of Papuan languages spoken around the Pahoturi (Paho River). This family includes six language varieties including Agöb (Dabu), Em, Ende, Kawam, Idi, and Taeme, which are spoken in the Pahoturi River area south of the Fly River, just west of the Eastern Trans-Fly languages. Ross (2005) tentatively includes them in the proposed Trans-Fly – Bulaka River family.

Some Pahoturi River speakers were originally hunter-gatherers, but had recently shifted to becoming gardeners.

Classification
Wurm (1975) and Ross (2005) suggest that the Pahoturi languages may be related to the Tabo (Waia) language just north of the Fly delta. However, they present no evidence, and the pronouns do not match.

Evans (2018) classifies the Pahoturi River languages as an independent language family.

Languages
The six varieties have traditionally been grouped into the following two language groups:

 Agöb (Dabu), Em, Ende, and Kawam
 Idi and Taeme

Preliminary work on the language family suggests that these varieties form a dialect chain.

Pahoturi River languages and respective demographic information listed by Evans (2018) are provided below.

{| 
|+ List of Pahoturi River languages
! Language !! Location !! Population !! Alternate names
|-
| Idi || central-east Morehead Rural LLG || 774 || 
|-
| Taeme || northeast Morehead Rural LLG || 834 || Tame
|-
| Agob || southeast Morehead Rural LLG || 1,437 || Bugi, Dabu
|-
| Ende || east Morehead Rural LLG || 542 || 
|-
| Kawam || east Morehead Rural LLG and west Oriomo-Bituri Rural LLG || 457 || 
|}

Phonemes
Usher (2020) reconstructs the consonant inventory as follows:

{| 
|*m || *mʷ || *n ||  ||  || *ŋ || [*ŋʷ]
|-
|*p || *pʷ || *t || *ʈ || *ts || *k || *kʷ
|-
|*b || *bʷ || *d || *ɖ || *dz || *g || *gʷ
|-
|*mb || *mbʷ || *nd || *ɳɖ || *ndz || *ŋg || *ŋgʷ
|-
| || || *l || *ɭ ||  ||  || 
|-
| || *w || *r || *ɽ || *j ||  || 
|}

Pronouns
The pronouns Ross reconstructs for the family are:

Proto-Pahoturi

{| class="wikitable"
|-
|I||*ŋa-na||we||?
|-
|thou||*ba or *be||you||*-bi
|-
|s/he||*bo||they||?
|}

Lindsey lists the following pronouns for each of the language varieties in the family.

References

External links 
 Timothy Usher, New Guinea World, Paho River

 
Trans-Fly languages

Languages of Western Province (Papua New Guinea)